The first broadcasting receiving licence was introduced in 1904 to cover the reception of radio broadcasts. It is paid annually.

Historical timeline

Amateur radio reception licensing
The introduction of receiving licences was implemented by the General Post Office (GPO) using powers within the Wireless Telegraphy Act 1904. Section 2 of the Act allowed the Postmaster General to charge for the issuing of licenses permitting the "experimental" receipt of radio transmissions. The Wireless Telegraphy Act 1904 was introduced as a temporary measure, and required annual extensions by Parliament until replaced by the Wireless Telegraphy Act 1924.

A return made to Parliament in June 1906 showed that in the first two years of operation only sixty eight receiving licences were issued. By April 1913 the number had, according to figures then released by the GPO, risen to two thousand.

The First World War resulted in all licence holders receiving notice on 1 August 1914 from the Postmaster General that they were required to dismantle their receiving equipment, their broadcast receiving licences having been suspended.

In 1920, the Post Office licensed a small number of experimental transmitting stations, making general broadcasts.

BBC
At the instigation of the Post Office, the British Broadcasting Company was established in October 1922 by a group of radio manufacturers to produce radio programmes for the users of their products. Initially the broadcasts were funded by the sale of radio receiving sets, and carried sponsored programmes.

As part of the agreement with the Post Office, the Postmaster General started to apply a condition to broadcast receiving licences that the equipment used be "Type Approved by Postmaster General" and marked with the BBC logo.

Initially, the fee for receiving licences was 10 shillings, and remained at that rate until after the Second World War.

With the forming of the public British Broadcasting Corporation in 1927, the Post Office dedicated nearly the entirety of licence fee income to the funding of the BBC.

Television
The standard broadcast receiving licences covered reception of the BBC's 405-line television service between November 1936 and September 1939 at no additional cost.

The outbreak of the Second World War in 1939 led to the suspension of television broadcasts in the UK.

The television licence was introduced in June 1946 to coincide with the post-war resumption of the BBC service the same month. Television licences always included a licence to receive radio broadcasts.

From 1971, only the reception of television transmissions required a licence, and radio-only licences ceased to be issued.

Colour television
The colour television licence (actually a "colour supplementary fee" of £5 on top of the existing monochrome licence) was introduced in 1968, following the commencement of BBC2 colour transmissions the previous July.

Changing cost of the licence fee

The costs of the various licence fees have been increased over the years, and while this has often been done annually, there have sometimes been gaps of varying length, which will have resulted in an overall lowering of income in real terms to the BBC, sometimes at times of high inflation.  The green line on the chart shows the computed split between radio:TV licences before 1970, and the split between colour:black-and-white from 1970 onwards, as indicated by the numbers shown in the lower table number of licences issued. The computed split is the simple value for the total of the licences issued (at whatever price) divided by the number sold.

The licence fee is frozen in cash terms at its April 2010 level until April 2016.

Number of licences issued

The number of licences on issue at 31 March or 1 April by year is as follows:

(1) Owing to industrial action within the Post Office the figures for licences in force (at these dates) do not reflect the true licensing position on those dates.

(2) Radio only and combined radio & television licences were abolished on 1 February 1971.  From this date television only licences have been issued.

See also
 Television licence
Television licensing in the United Kingdom

References

External links
 Figures for 1927–1955: The British Broadcasting Corporation Annual Report and Accounts for the Year 1954–55 (HMSO 1955)
 Figures for 1956–1986: BBC Annual Report and Handbook 1987 (BBC 1986)
 Rounded figure for 1997 & 1998 (at 31 March): BBC Annual Report and Accounts 1997/1998 (BBC 2000)
 Rounded figures for 1999 & 2000 (at 31 March): BBC Annual Report and Accounts 1999/2000 (BBC 2000)
 Rounded figures for 2001 & 2002 (at 31 March): BBC Annual Report and Accounts 2001/2002 (BBC 2002)
 Rounded figures for 2003 & 2004 (at 31 March): BBC Annual Report and Accounts 2003/2004 (BBC 2004)
 Rounded figures for 2005 & 2006 (at 31 March): BBC Annual Report and Accounts 2005/2006 (BBC 2006)
 Rounded figures for 2007: BBC Annual Report and Accounts 2006/2007 (BBC 2007)
 Rounded figures for 2008: BBC Annual Report and Accounts 2008/2009 (BBC 2009)
 Rounded figures for 2009: BBC Annual Report and Accounts 2009/2010 (BBC 2010)
 Rounded figures for 2010: BBC Annual Report and Accounts 2010/2011 (BBC 2011)

External links
 The history of the UK radio licence

BBC
Television terminology
History of taxation in the United Kingdom